The Evil That Men Do is an original novel based on the U.S. television series Buffy the Vampire Slayer.

Plot summary

After a vicious shooting spree by Brian Dellasandro, a straight A student, the town of Sunnydale goes into a state of shock, though not one everyone would expect; they turn on each other and become nasty. At the same time, Helen, an ancient vicious vampire over 1500 years old, has come to Sunnydale. She has hunted and killed every single Slayer she has ever met in her life, and Buffy is next on her list. Helen and her lover, Julian, have come to Sunnydale to raise Meter, a goddess of destruction, and to do that they need the heart of the Slayer and the ashes of the Emperor Caligula from way back when in 47 A.D. The urn, containing his ashes, has arrived in Joyce's gallery, and is later stolen.
After a run-in with Helen, Buffy learns that Angelus and Helen used to be paramours in the 19th century, but that it ended when he regained his soul. Angel explains to her about Helen's past and how she came to hunt down Slayers.

Buffy and her friends are captured and suited up on the night of Meter's ascension. They are led onto a battleground where Buffy must stay alive against dozens of opponents as well as her friends who have been infected by the Potion of Madness in order to prevent Meter from rising.

Canonical issues

Buffy novels, such as this one are not considered by most fans as part of canon. They are usually not considered as official Buffyverse reality, but are novels from the authors' imaginations. However unlike fanfic, 'overviews' summarising their story, written early in the writing process, were 'approved' by both Fox and Whedon (or his office), and the books were therefore later published as officially Buffy merchandise.

Background
The book was originally supposed to be released in July 1999, but was postponed due to the Columbine High School massacre. The Columbine incident also influenced the airings of the episodes "Earshot" and "Graduation Day, Part Two".

External links

Reviews
Litefoot1969.bravepages.com - Review of this book by Litefoot
Teen-books.com - Reviews of this book
Nika-summers.com - Review of this book by Nika Summers
Shadowcat.name - Review of this book

2000 novels
Books based on Buffy the Vampire Slayer